The next Castilian-Leonese regional election will be held no later than Saturday, 21 March 2026, to elect the 12th Cortes of the autonomous community of Castile and León. All 81 seats in the Cortes will be up for election. The electoral calendar of Castile and León was altered as a result of the 2022 snap election, meaning it is likely for the election to be held in a date different than that of the regularly scheduled May regional and elections in 2023.

Overview

Electoral system
The Cortes of Castile and León are the devolved, unicameral legislature of the autonomous community of Castile and León, having legislative power in regional matters as defined by the Spanish Constitution and the Castilian-Leonese Statute of Autonomy, as well as the ability to vote confidence in or withdraw it from a regional president.

Voting for the Cortes is on the basis of universal suffrage, which comprises all nationals over 18 years of age, registered in Castile and León and in full enjoyment of their political rights. The "begged" or expat vote system, requiring Castilian-Leonese people abroad to apply for voting before being permitted to vote, was repealed in 2022. All members of the Cortes of Castile and León are elected using the D'Hondt method and a closed list proportional representation, with an electoral threshold of three percent of valid votes—which includes blank ballots—being applied in each constituency. Seats are allocated to constituencies, corresponding to the provinces of Ávila, Burgos, León, Palencia, Salamanca, Segovia, Soria, Valladolid and Zamora, with each being allocated an initial minimum of three seats, as well as one additional member per each 45,000 inhabitants or fraction greater than 22,500.

As a result of the aforementioned allocation, each constituency is provisionally entitled the following seats for the next regional election:

The use of the D'Hondt method may result in a higher effective threshold, depending on the district magnitude.

Election date
The term of the Cortes of Castile and León expires four years after the date of their previous election, unless they are dissolved earlier. The election decree shall be issued no later than the twenty-fifth day prior to the date of expiry of parliament and published on the following day in the Official Gazette of Castile and León (BOCYL), with election day taking place between the fifty-fourth and sixtieth days from publication. The previous election was held on 13 February 2022, which means that the legislature's term will expire on 13 February 2026. The election decree shall be published in the BOCYL no later than 20 January 2026, with the election taking place up to the sixtieth day from publication, setting the latest possible election date for the Cortes on Saturday, 21 March 2026.

The president has the prerogative to dissolve the Cortes of Castile and León and call a snap election, provided that no motion of no confidence is in process and that dissolution does not occur either during the first legislative session or before one year has elapsed since a previous dissolution. In the event of an investiture process failing to elect a regional president within a two-month period from the first ballot, the Cortes shall be automatically dissolved and a fresh election called.

Parliamentary composition
The table below shows the composition of the parliamentary groups in the Cortes at the present time.

Parties and candidates
The electoral law allows for parties and federations registered in the interior ministry, coalitions and groupings of electors to present lists of candidates. Parties and federations intending to form a coalition ahead of an election are required to inform the relevant Electoral Commission within ten days of the election call, whereas groupings of electors need to secure the signature of at least one percent of the electorate in the constituencies for which they seek election, disallowing electors from signing for more than one list of candidates.

Below is a list of the main parties and electoral alliances which will likely contest the election:

Opinion polls
The table below lists voting intention estimates in reverse chronological order, showing the most recent first and using the dates when the survey fieldwork was done, as opposed to the date of publication. Where the fieldwork dates are unknown, the date of publication is given instead. The highest percentage figure in each polling survey is displayed with its background shaded in the leading party's colour. If a tie ensues, this is applied to the figures with the highest percentages. The "Lead" column on the right shows the percentage-point difference between the parties with the highest percentages in a poll. When available, seat projections determined by the polling organisations are displayed below (or in place of) the percentages in a smaller font; 41 seats are required for an absolute majority in the Cortes of Castile and León.

Notes

References
Opinion poll sources

Other

Castile and León
2020s